National Democratic Front of Boroland - Progressive (P) was one of the three factions of the National Democratic Front of Boroland, it was in peace talks with the Government of India along with the D.R. Nabla faction. In 2020, it was disbanded after signing a peace agreement with government

Objectives
Their main objective was to carve out a separate Boro homeland from the state of Assam.

Leaders
B. Sungthagra represented as president of the faction.

Strength
Over 3,000 members of NDFB (P) are currently housed in three government approved designated ceasefire camps in Udalguri, Baksa and Kokrajhar districts of Assam.

Other major demands
Apart from Boroland, other demands of the faction included socio-cultural and economic demands. Some of these included – protection of land rights and political rights of Boro people outside the proposed Bodoland area, Inner line permits, reorganisations of districts, delimitation and reservations of Assembly and Parliamentary constituencies, preservation and promotion of Boro culture, tradition and language, establishing of institutes of higher learning such as central universities, medical and engineering colleges, creation of Boro regiment and paramilitary forces, special development package, general amnesty to all militants, setting up of legal institutions, strengthening of air, rail and road transport system, setting up industries and employment generation, etc.

References

Organisations designated as terrorist by India